Little Green Bag is the 1970 debut album by the Dutch rock band George Baker Selection. It attracted additional attention after Quentin Tarantino used the title track on his movie Reservoir Dogs.

Track list

Personnel 
George Baker – electric guitar, acoustic guitar, rhythm guitar, piano, lead vocals
Job Netten – electric guitar, acoustic guitar, lead guitar
Jaques Greuter – hammond organ, electric guitar, acoustic guitar, triangle
Jan Visser – bass guitar, backing vocals
Hank Kramer – saxophone, tambourine, drums
Ton Vreedenburg – drums

Production 
 Design [Grafik – Design]– Ariola-Eurodisc-Atelier*, Kortemeier, Vormstein*  *

References

George Baker Selection albums
1970 debut albums
Hansa Records albums